Ghida Fakhry is a Lebanese-British journalist. She was a lead anchor for the global news channel Al Jazeera English at its launch in Washington DC, and was later one of the primary anchors at the network's headquarters in Doha. She was also the host of Witness, a documentary program.

Career

Ghida Fakhry started her TV career as a Middle East analyst for CNN and was a CNN world report contributor. She later became New York Bureau Chief and Columnist for a leading London-based Middle East newspaper covering the annual General Assembly meetings of the UN. As New York Correspondent and Bureau Chief for Al Jazeera from 2000, she covered the 9/11 attacks. Fakhry conducted interviews in Washington D.C. with U.S. Secretary of Defense, Donald Rumsfeld, and the Secretary of State, Colin Powell, as well as several other senior State Department and Pentagon officials. She reported on location from Baghdad and Kabul in the summer of 2003 while traveling with Rumsfeld during his first trip to Iraq after the US-led invasion and covered his visit to the Abu Ghraib prison. Fakhry joined Al Jazeera English at its launch in 2006, taking on the role of Lead Female Anchor in the network's Washington DC broadcast center. She presented the award-winning documentary program Witness in 2010. In 2017, she joined TRT World and launched a monthly global affairs program Bigger than Five. Since 2020, she also now hosts the weekly political program Inside America with Ghida Fakhry.

Awards and recognition
2007: Voted as one of four US-based news anchors in Esquire Magazine's annual 'Women We Love'

2012: George Foster Peabody Award for Al Jazeera's coverage of the Arab 
Awakening

2013: Named among the World's Most Influential Arabs by Arabian Business Power 500

References

External links
 

Al Jazeera people
Boston University alumni
Alumni of SOAS University of London
Living people
People from Beirut
Lebanese television presenters
Lebanese women television presenters
Lebanese journalists
Lebanese women journalists
Year of birth missing (living people)